This is a list of hospitals in Papua New Guinea.

Hospitals
Papua New Guinea had a population of over seven million in 2011 with over 80 percent living in rural areas.  According to the World Health Organization  in 2014, there were seven regional hospitals, 19 provincial hospitals, 89 district hospitals, 677 health centre's, and 2,600 health posts in Papua New Guinea. Many rural hospitals have closed because of shortages of supplies.

References

 Hospitals in Papua New Guinea
 Hospitals
Papua New Guinea
Hospitals
Papua New Guinea